The Walsingham School was a secondary school located in the St Paul's Cray area of the London Borough of Bromley, England.

History
The school originally operated as two separate schools: Midfield secondary for Boys at the South end of the site, and Midfield Secondary for Girls at the North end.  

In September 1969 the name was changed to Walsingham. The two schools were merged into a single co-educational school in September 1974. 

The original head teacher in the girls school was Mrs Shaw.  Mrs Wheeler took over until she retired in 1974.

Mr Wakefield was the head teacher of the boys school.

The school closed on 31 August 1990 and the school buildings were demolished.

After the closure
Following the demolition of the school buildings, the land was used for housing, as well as the purpose built Bromley Valley Gymnastics Centre.

Defunct schools in the London Borough of Bromley
Demolished buildings and structures in London
Educational institutions disestablished in 1990
Educational institutions with year of establishment missing
Former buildings and structures in the London Borough of Bromley
1990 disestablishments in England